There are 52 episodes of Renford Rejects.

Series one

Series two

Series Three

Series Four

Lists of British children's television series episodes